The Park Lane Hotel is a New York City luxury hotel at 36 Central Park South, between Fifth and Sixth Avenues in Midtown Manhattan, overlooking Central Park.  Constructed in 1971, the hotel was designed by the prolific architecture firm, Emery Roth & Sons, for prominent New York City real estate developer Harry Helmsley. The hotel operates under the ownership of Steve Witkoff’s real estate investment firm, the Witkoff Group. A supertall skyscraper has been planned for the site, though that has been placed on hold.

History
In the early 20th century, several notable hotels were built to cater to the area's affluent visitors, including the JW Marriott Essex House (Frank Grad, 1930), The Pierre (Schultze & Weaver, 1930), the Plaza Hotel (Henry Hardenbergh, 1905–1907), and the Sherry-Netherland Hotel (Schultze & Weaver with Buchman & Kahn, 1926–1927).  These hotels adjoined the green expanse of Central Park and sit on parcels that have long been desirable for the development of luxury hotels. The Helmsley Park Lane Hotel was a modern addition to this highly historic and coveted Luxury Hotel district of Central Park South.

The Helmsley Park Lane Hotel's construction spanned from 1967 to its final completion in 1971, during a mid-century building boom that began around 1960 and ended with the collapse of financial markets in 1969.
The Park Lane reflects the unbridled, post-war optimism inherent in New York's growth as a world financial and cultural center, and catered to affluent guests from around the world. The hotel also attracted a new class of business travelers who appreciated high-end luxury hotels, versus the convention trade focused hotels of the time period.

The Helmsley Park Lane Hotel was owned and operated by Helmsley-Spear, Inc., the real estate development company run by Harry and wife Leona Helmsley, until it was sold to Steve Witkoff's Witkoff Group in 2013, following Leona's death in 2007.

The Park Lane Hotel structure, at the center of a preservation battle between Witkoff and architects, was purchased by the former in 2013 for $660 million. Witkoff ultimately won the battle, and the structure did not gain landmark status. In 2014, a grassroots effort stemming from architectural enthusiast and community members, Save Park Lane NY, was formed with the goal of preserving the hotel and presenting a case for historic preservation to the Landmarks Preservation Commission of New York City. Save Park Lane NY was to present the request for landmark preservation of the Park Lane Hotel to Community Board 5 on October 6, 2014.

Architecture
The Park Lane's design bridges the gap between modernism and post modernism. Guestrooms and suites at the Park Lane capture unobstructed panoramic views of Central Park from sleek black windows that span the entire vertical height of the limestone forty-six story structure. The hotel is composed of a vertical slab rising above a two-story, L-shaped base. Emery Roth & Sons specialized in high-rise commercial buildings and worked in partnership with many other major real estate developers such as the Durst Organization, Tishman Construction, and the Uris Corporation. Significant examples of their work in New York include the MetLife Building (1963), 600 Lexington Avenue (1984), and the New York Palace Hotel (1980).

Proposed supertall skyscraper
1 Park Lane, a proposed 1,210-foot supertall skyscraper, would be located on the site of the Park Lane Hotel. It is being developed by Steve Witkoff's Witkoff Group and designed by Handel Architects. If built, the building would rank fourth tallest in New York City. No permits have been filed for modifications to the old structure yet. The building would contain eighty-eight condominiums. Amenities would include a library, a pool, a spa, and a restaurant.

As of early 2016, Witkoff announced that plans for the tower had been put on hold. Co-owner Jho Low had failed to pay his share of the hotel's mortgage in July 2016. In May 2017, Witkoff and his associates put the hotel up for sale, forced by a United States Department of Justice forfeiture complaint against Low. The hotel was put on sale for $1 billion, but all of the bids for the hotel were for a much lower price.

References

External links
Save Park Lane NY

1971 establishments in New York City
59th Street (Manhattan)
Emery Roth buildings
Hotel buildings completed in 1971
Midtown Manhattan
Skyscraper hotels in Manhattan